Joseph Beaume (27 September 1796 in Marseilles – 11 September 1885 in Paris) was a French historical painter.

Biography
Baume was a favourite pupil of Antoine-Jean Gros and a frequent contributor to the Salon between 1819 and 1878. In the time of King Louis Philippe he was commissioned to paint several large battle-pieces for Versailles. His "Henri III. on his Death-bed" was in the Luxembourg in 1903.

In 1836 he was made a Knight of the Legion of Honour. He died in Paris in September 1885.

Notes

References
 
 "Joseph Beaume, a distinguished French painter aged 87 years"

Attribution:

External links

1796 births
1885 deaths
Chevaliers of the Légion d'honneur